Marie Harel (born Marie Catherine Fontaine; April 28, 1761 – November 9, 1844) was a French cheesemaker, who, along with Abbot Charles-Jean Bonvoust, invented Camembert cheese, according to local legend. She worked as a cheesemaker at the Manor of Beaumoncel and made Camembert cheeses according to local custom. Her main contribution was to have initiated a dynasty of entrepreneurial cheesemakers who developed the production of Camembert cheese on a large scale, notably her grandson Cyrille Paynel, born in 1817, who created a cheese factory in the commune of Le Mesnil-Mauger in Calvados at France.

Personal life
Marie Harel was born Marie Catherine Fontaine on April 28, 1761, at Crouttes (Orne), near Vimoutiers in Normandy. On May 10, 1785, in Camembert, Orne, she married Jacques Harel, a laborer at Roiville.  She died November 9, 1844, at Vimoutiers, Orne.

Invention of Camembert
Since the end of the 17th century, a renowned cheese was being produced in the Camembert region of Normandy.  In his Geographic Dictionary, published in 1708, Thomas Corneille wrote:  "Vimonstiers: [...] every Monday a large market is held, to which are brought excellent cheeses from Livarot and Camembert."  The invention of Camembert cheese as a regional product distinct from prior local cheeses is attributed to Marie Harel who would have benefited from the advice of a refractory priest, Abbot Charles-Jean Bonvoust, who was hidden in 1796–97 at the Manor of Beaumoncel where she worked. He was a native of Brie and passed along to Marie a recipe for a kind of cheese with a bloomy edible rind, such as was produced in his native area. Prior to this, Marie would have been making cheeses in the local style.

She initiated a dynasty of entrepreneurial cheese makers who produced Camembert cheese on a large scale, notably her grandson Cyrille Paynel, born in 1817, who created a cheese factory in the commune of Le Mesnil-Mauger in Calvados.

The success of the production of Camembert in the first half of the 19th century was largely due to the descendants of Harel, who considered themselves the only legitimate users of the designation "Camembert".  However, beginning in 1870, other Norman cheese makers contested this family monopoly.

The town of Vimoutiers had a statue to her. On 14 June 1944, during the Battle of Normandy, Vimoutiers was bombarded by Allied forces. The village was destroyed and 220 people died. 400 people of Van Wert, Ohio contributed in the costs of reconstruction and reparation of the town including the replacement of Marie Harel's statue in 1953. This is recorded by a plaque in the market square of Vimoutiers.

A legend says that she died in Champosoult, but actually it was her daughter, also named Marie (1781–1855), who died there. Harel was also honored with a Google Doodle on the occasion of her 256th birthday in 2017.

See also

 Types of cheese

References

Further reading
 Pierre Boisard, Le Camembert, mythe français, Paris, Odile Jacob, 2007.

French cheeses
Cow's-milk cheeses
18th-century French inventors
People from Orne
1761 births
1844 deaths
Cheesemakers
Women inventors
18th-century French businesspeople
19th-century French businesspeople
18th-century French businesswomen
19th-century French businesswomen